Panic Movement is the first release by indie/garage rock band The Hiss. It was released in August 2003 on Loog records and is distributed throughout America by Sanctuary Records. The song "Back On the Radio" was featured in Tony Hawk's Underground 2, and the first single "Triumph" entered the UK top 20. Some enhanced copies on the Sanctuary Records release have 2 bonus videos.

Track listing 
"Clever Kicks" 2:23
"Triumph" 4:08
"Listen to Me" 4:15
"Back on the Radio" 4:12
"Not for Hire" 5:10
"Riverbed" 2:29
"Ghost's Gold" 6:27
"Lord's Prayer" 2:42
"Hard to Lose" 4:03
"Step Aside" 3:49
"Brass Tacks" 3:11
"City People" 3:03

Misc.
On the video for Back on the Radio (found on the enhanced copies) it reads: "Loog Records Presents: The Hiss in Shame the Devil". Even though it says Loog Records, the CD case has Sanctuary Records printed on the back.

References

Sources
[ Panic Movement at AMG]

2003 albums
Albums produced by Owen Morris